Crux Easton is a hamlet in the Ashmansworth civil parish of Hampshire, England, about  south of Newbury, Berkshire.

History
The Church of England parish church of St Michael and All Angels was built in 1775, restored in 1894 and is a Grade II* listed building.

In 1870 official records showed that Crux Easton parish covered , had a population of 76, and had 17 houses.

There is a wind engine at Crux Easton that was made by John Wallis Titt in about 1892.

During the Second World War, the British Union of Fascists leader Sir Oswald Mosley bought Crux Easton House, where he and his wife Diana were placed under house arrest in 1944.

Geoffrey de Havilland's father was vicar of Crux Easton.

Thomas Croc
A grant [1216-1272] of corn was made by Thomas Croc [Croch](dead by 1230) to the Canons of the Church of Saint John the Baptist, Sandleford of three quarters de meliori frumento [the better corn] annually in his town and manor of Estun. Witnesses: Sir Henry de Wodecote  [ Woodcott ], John Lanceleuee, Robert Lord de Vrleston, William de Edmundestrop, Richard de Quercu, Bartholomew Croc, Vrlestun, son of Ranuld de Vndecote and Richard Croc.

References

Further reading

External links

Villages in Hampshire